Gabriele de Seta (born 1986) is a digital anthropologist and sociologist specialising in everyday digital culture in the Chinese speaking world. His scholarly publications on digital ethnographic methodology and on popular Chinese digital culture are frequently cited in the field of internet studies. He works at the University of Bergen.

Education and career 

Gabriele de Seta has a PhD in Sociology from the Hong Kong Polytechnic University (2016), after which he worked as a postdoctoral fellow at the Institute of Ethnology, Academia Sinica in Taipei, Taiwan. He joined the University of Bergen in 2020 as a postdoctoral fellow.

Research focus 
De Seta is most known for his extensive research on how digital media and the internet are used creatively and in everyday life in the Chinese-speaking world. He first realised how significant digital media were to Chinese social life when studying experimental music in Shanghai. 

His articles "WeChat as infrastructure: The techno-nationalist shaping of Chinese digital platforms" (with Jean-Christophe Plantin) and "Through the looking glass: Twenty years of Chinese Internet research" (with David Kurt Herold) present broad analyses of the Chinese internet, while he in other articles analyses specific cultural phenomena such as biaoqing (visual forms of expression like emoji, digital stickers etc.), trolling in social media globally and in a Chinese context, and digital folklore more broadly, including how Pepe the Frog became  embroiled in the Hong Kong pro-democracy movement.

Throughout his work he has emphasised how technology is not universal, but is used and interpreted differently in different cultural contexts. In addition to the ethnographic approach in much of his work, de Seta has contributed to theoretical frameworks by developing Bratton's concept of the "stack" to show how the Chinese Internet relies upon a partly different societal infrastructure.

De Seta's reflections on digital ethnography's methodologies have also been influential. His 2020 paper "Three Lies of Digital Ethnography", which draws upon Gary Alan Fine's "Ten Lies of Ethnography", is a self-reflexive analysis of how methodological illusions can be useful heuristics for research. The paper was translated to Spanish in 2021.  Another paper, which de Seta co-authored with Crystal Abidin, analyses methodological mistakes the authors have made in order to develop a more robust understanding of digital ethnography.

From 2020 he has been a researcher with Jill Walker Rettberg's team at the University of Bergen, researching machine vision technologies from a cultural perspective. As part of this project he has published on deepfakes in China, and has written a speculative scifi story about potential future versions of QR codes. In an analysis of the Chinese use of visual technologies in response to the COVID-19 pandemic, de Seta coined the term "optical governance".

Awards 
De Seta won the University of Bergen Prize for Young Researchers in the Humanities in 2022.

References 

Italian anthropologists
Academic staff of the University of Bergen
Italian sociologists
Italian sinologists
1986 births
Living people